Zarafa is a 2012 French-Belgian animated film directed by Rémi Bezançon and . It was released on 8 February 2012 in France.  The story was inspired by a historical giraffe known today as Zarafa.

Plot
The film is framed by a village elder (Vernon Dobtcheff) telling a story to a group of eager children.

Set in the early 19th Century, the story tells of Maki (Max Renaudin), a ten-year-old orphaned Sudanese boy who has been sold into slavery with his friend Soula. He escapes the villainous slave trader Moreno (Thierry Frémont) and comes across a young giraffe and its mother. Moreno catches up to Maki and kills the mother giraffe. Maki promises the calf's mother that he'll protect and nurture her. Just as Moreno is about to take him to his slave camp, Hassan, a Bedouin nomad (Simon Abkarian), intervenes and saves his life. Maki follows Hassan as soon as he takes the giraffe with him. Hassan names the giraffe Zarafa (Arabic for "giraffe") and reluctantly agrees to take care of Maki and Zarafa.  They come across a merchant, Mahmoud, who gives them two Tibetan cows, Mounh and Sounh. Maki discovers Soula being forced into slave labor by Moreno. When the evil man turns his attention on Maki, Soula hits him with a palm leaf, but before Moreno can beat her with his whip, Maki cries out for her and Hassan steps in. Maki thanks Hassan for saving him.

Hassan is on a mission to the Pasha of Egypt, Mehemet Ali, who wants to offer a young giraffe to the King of France, Charles X, to convince him to unite his country against the Ottomans besieging Alexandria. Maki and Hassan join together with the aeronaut Malaterre (François-Xavier Demaison), who agrees to take Zarafa to Paris via a hot air balloon. Hassan convinces Maki to leave Zarafa, but Malaterre thinks otherwise, seeing Maki's determination, and takes the boy with them. The basket gets heavy, so the cows jump overboard, and Hassan unwittingly tosses Maki after them, as Maki is hidden in a bale of hay. Maki and the two cows land on a pirate ship, where they come across the pirate queen Bouboulina and her ragtag crew. Maki explains that he is in pursuit of a treasure of great value aboard the balloon. Instead of taking him prisoner, Bouboulina welcomes Maki to her crew. Meanwhile, Moreno is determined to hunt down Maki and arrives on shore with Soula in tow. Bouboulina and her crew rescue Maki and scare off Moreno and his henchmen. The group continues on their journey. During a perilous crossing of the mountains where the balloon crashed, one of the cows is taken by a pack of wolves.

Hassan, Maki, Malaterre, and the surviving cow eventually reach Paris. The cynical King Charles accepts the gift but refuses to help the Pasha. Zarafa is shut away in the city zoo, and Maki stays firm about returning the giraffe to her home. Moreno kidnaps him and forces him to work in his household. Hassan is ashamed that he had failed his mission and mortified to have lost Maki, so he sinks into despair and alcohol. As several years pass, Zarafa's appearance causes "giraffe mania" and she grows up. Maki finds himself at zoo with Soula. King Charles is receiving a new hippopotamus, and, remembering an experience he had with one before meeting Hassan, Maki tells Soula to hold up her parasol. Maki does the same and the hippo squirts a colossal pile of dung onto King Charles and his subjects, giving the children enough time to make a getaway. They manage to find Malaterre and Maki plans to escape with Zarafa in the hot air balloon. The trio locate Hassan, but the nomad is unable to help them, since he has become an alcoholic. They rush to free Zarafa, but now she is too large to fit into the balloon. Maki realizes that he must give up Zarafa and escape with Soula. Moreno appears and prepares to kill Maki, but Hassan steps in to protect them and is shot. Aided by Malaterre, Maki and Soula escape in the balloon. Moreno gives chase, but the two friends bite him and he falls off the basket and into an enclosure where he is devoured by a polar bear. Maki and Soula return home, marry, and found a flourishing new village. Hassan, treated at the hospital, survives his wounds and falls in love with Bouboulina.

As it turns out, the storyteller is actually Maki himself.

Voice cast

French version
 Max Renaudin as Maki                                              
 Simon Abkarian as Hassan 
 Sjaak Caderyn as Hassan
 Abraham Adesoye as Pika
 François-Xavier Demaison as Malaterre 
 Vernon Dobtcheff as Le vieux sage 
 Roger Dumas as Charles X 
 Ronit Elkabetz as	Bouboulina 
 Mohamed Fellag as	Mahmoud
 Déborah François as Zarafa adulte 
 Thierry Frémont as Moreno
 Dazzy Iannuzzio Bogo
 Madigan Kacmar as Traore 
 Philippe Morier-Genoud as Saint-Hilaire

English version
 Joe Ochman as Malaterre (as B.J. Oakie)
 Chinua B. Payne as Lumba
 Mike Pollock as Zuma
 Clara Quilichini as Soula
 Scott Rayow as Moreno (as Scottie Ray)
 Cindy Robinson as Bouboulina 
 Erica Schroeder as Zarafa
 Jason Simon as Charles X
 Zariah Singletary as Deka
 Michael Sorich as Mahmoud 
 Joel Stigliano as	Pacha 
 Mostéfa Stiti as Pacha
 Raeusi Uraeus as Maki 
 Wayne Grayson as Demis 
 Nýa-Jolie Walters as Soula

Background and controversy
The film was based on the historical event, of the Giraffe given to Charles X of France by Muhammad Ali of Egypt, and Rémi Bezançon wanted to make a film of it as soon as he heard about it, and was also keen to explore the issue of slavery in a film.

The film was accused of distorting the historical facts about how the giraffe was treated, and the Museum d'histoire naturelle created a temporary exhibition entitled The True story of Zarafa to present its own version of history. But mostly it received positive reviews from critics.

Accolades

References

External links
 

2010s French animated films
2012 animated films
2012 films
Belgian animated films
Pathé films
Films directed by Rémi Bezançon
Fictional giraffes
Animated films about mammals
2010s children's animated films
2010s French-language films
French-language Belgian films